Chen Shui-tsai (born 8 October 1948) is a Taiwanese politician. He was the first Magistrate of Kinmen County from 1993 to 2001.

Kinmen County magistracy

2010 Mainland China visit
Chen and 180 delegates visited Xiamen in Fujian Province in December 2010 for a four-day visit to inaugurate the historic direct ferry links from Taiwan to Mainland China. He said that new limited direct links between the two sides could expand into full trade, transportation and postal ties under mini Three Links before end of 2010. Chen met with Xiamen Mayor Zhu Yayan.

References

1948 births
Living people
Magistrates of Kinmen County